Marcos Álvarez Pérez  is a Mexican politician affiliated with the Party of the Democratic Revolution. As of 2014 he served as Deputy of the LIX Legislature of the Mexican Congress representing the State of Mexico as replacement of Héctor Miguel Bautista López.

References

Date of birth unknown
Living people
Politicians from the State of Mexico
Party of the Democratic Revolution politicians
Year of birth missing (living people)
Deputies of the LIX Legislature of Mexico
Members of the Chamber of Deputies (Mexico) for the State of Mexico